Granje may refer to the following places:

 Granje, Bosnia and Herzegovina
 Granje, Croatia